Callum Michael Sheedy (born 28 October 1995) is a professional rugby union player for Bristol Bears in Premiership Rugby and for the Wales national rugby union team. His usual position is fly-half.

Club career
Sheedy has previously played on loan for Clifton, Dings Crusaders, Cinderford and Jersey Reds.

Sheedy joined the Bristol Bears ahead of the 2014/15 Greene King IPA Championship campaign and scored 22 points in a stunning display in the play-off final to help Bristol achieve promotion.

International career
Born in Cardiff, Wales, Sheedy qualified for Ireland through his parents and England through residency; he has appeared for both Wales and Ireland age grade representative sides, and was named in June 2019 in an uncapped "England XV" side to face the Barbarians, though he was an unused substitute.

He was named in the senior Wales squad for the 2020 Autumn Nations Cup. On 13 November 2020, Sheedy made his international debut for Wales, coming off the bench in a 32-9 loss to Ireland. On 13 March 2021, Sheedy scored his first international try for Wales against Italy in the 2021 Six Nations.

International tries

Honours
Bristol
RFU Championship: 2015–16, 2017–18
European Challenge Cup: 2019-20
Wales
Six Nations Championship: 2021

References

1995 births
Living people
Bristol Bears players
Rugby union fly-halves
Rugby union players from Cardiff
Wales international rugby union players
Welsh rugby union players
People educated at Millfield